Dark Secrets is a 1923 American silent feature drama film directed by Victor Fleming and starring Dorothy Dalton. It is not known whether the film currently survives, which suggests that it is a lost film.

Synopsis

Cast
 Dorothy Dalton as Ruth Rutherford
 Robert Ellis as Lord Wallington
 José Ruben as Dr. Mohammed Ali
 Ellen Cassidy as Mildred Rice
 Pat Hartigan as Biskra
 Warren Cook as Dr. Case
 Julia Swayne Gordon as Mrs. Rutherford

References

External links

Lantern slide promotion in color

1923 films
Films directed by Victor Fleming
American black-and-white films
American silent feature films
1923 drama films
Silent American drama films
1920s American films